The Vitréais, known in Breton as Gwitregad, is a Breton cake. It is a specialty of Vitré, a city in eastern Brittany, France. It is a cake made of apples with salted butter caramel, eggs and almonds.

References

External links
 Recipe for the Vitréais: an easy recipe on how to make the vitréais at home

Breton cuisine
French desserts
Cakes
Apple dishes